Orionette is a historic German motorcycle brand.

The Orionette AG für Motorfahrzeuge (also: Orion AG für Motorfahrzeuge) was a German motorcycle manufacturer. The company was founded in 1921. The company's headquarters was the Industriehof Oranienstraße 6 in Berlin-Kreuzberg. There was also the serial production of the Orionette. It was one of the most important companies in the automotive and motorcycle industry in Berlin.

The design department, headed by Engelbert Zaschka, also produced some interesting unorthodox designs. Unfortunately the very desmodromic lay-out of this interesting two-stroke engine still remains secret. It is called system Zaschka.

At last later sales declined and in 1925 the company went bankrupt and closed.

References

External links 
 Orionette
 ORIONETTE, MOTORETTE  - GTÜ - Oldtimerservice (German)
 The Long History of Reverse-Cylinder Engine Designs - motocrossactionmag.com

Vehicle manufacturing companies established in 1921
Motorcycle manufacturers of Germany
1925 disestablishments in Germany
German brands
1921 establishments in Germany
Vehicle manufacturing companies disestablished in 1925